The Tasmanian Government Railways L class was a class of 2-6-2+2-6-2 Garratt steam locomotives operated by the Tasmanian Government Railways.

History
In 1912, the Tasmanian Government Railways took delivery of two 2-6-2+2-6-2 Garratt locomotives from Beyer, Peacock & Co, Manchester. They were designed to haul freight trains, however did on occasions haul passenger trains. Both were withdrawn in 1930 after the Q class entered service. However, a motive power shortage during World War II saw both overhauled and returned to service in 1943. Both were withdrawn when replaced by Australian Standard Garratts in 1945.

References

Beyer, Peacock locomotives
Railway locomotives introduced in 1912
Steam locomotives of Tasmania
2-6-2+2-6-2 locomotives
3 ft 6 in gauge locomotives of Australia
Garratt locomotives